Nicolas Koline (1878–1973) was a Russian stage and film actor. He established himself in Russia as a stage performer with the Moscow Art Theatre. He emigrated from Russia after the October Revolution of 1917 and came to France with La Chauve-Souris cabaret run by Nikita Balieff. In Paris he then joined Joseph Ermolieff's film company at Montreuil.  He appeared in numerous French and German films during his career, initially often as a leading player during the silent era and later in supporting roles.

Selected filmography
 1923: La Maison du mystère / The House of Mystery (dir. Alexandre Volkoff)
 1923: Le Brasier ardent (dir. Ivan Mosjoukine)
 1924: Kean ou Désordre et génie / Kean (dir. Alexandre Volkoff)
 1924: Âme d'artiste / Heart of an Actress (dir. Germaine Dulac)
 1926: Michel Strogoff (dir. Victor Tourjansky)
 1926: 600,000 francs par mois / 600,000 Francs a Month (dir. Nicolas Koline and Robert Péguy)
 1927: Napoléon (dir. Abel Gance)
 1927: Croquette (dir. Louis Mercanton)
 1928: Hurrah! Ich lebe! / Hurrah! I Live! (dir. Wilhelm Thiele)
 1928: Geheimnisse des Orients / Shéhérazade / Secrets of the Orient (dir. Alexandre Volkoff)
 1935: Varieté / Variety (dir. Nicolas Farkas)
 1937: Patrioten / Patriots (dir. Karl Ritter)
 1937: Menschen ohne Vaterland / Men Without a Fatherland (dir. Herbert Maisch)
 1938: Geheimzeichen LB 17 / Secret Code LB 17 (dir. Victor Tourjansky)
 1939: Alarm auf Station III / Alarm at Station III (dir. Philipp Lothar Mayring)
 1939: Der Gouverneur / The Governor (dir. Victor Tourjansky)
 1940: Feinde / Enemies (dir. Victor Tourjansky)
 1942: Anschlag auf Baku / Attack on Baku (dir. Fritz Kirchhoff)
 1944: Orient-Express (dir. Victor Tourjansky)
 1948: Die Zeit mit dir / The Time with You (dir. George Hurdalek)
 1948: Film ohne Titel / Film Without a Title (dir. Rudolf Jugert)
 1948: Der Apfel ist ab / The Original Sin (dir. Helmut Käutner)
 1949: Der blaue Strohhut / The Blue Straw Hat (dir. Victor Tourjansky)
 1949: Nachtwache / Keepers of the Night (dir. Harald Braun)
 1950: Der Mann, der sich selber sucht / The Man in Search of Himself (dir. Géza von Cziffra)
 1950: Die Treppe / The Staircase (dir. Alfred Braun and Wolfgang Staudte)
 1951: Der Tiger Akbar / The Tiger Akbar (dir. Harry Piel)
 1952: Cuba Cabana (dir. Fritz Peter Buch)
 1952: Lockende Sterne / Shooting Stars (dir. Hans Müller)
 1952: Gift im Zoo / Poison in the Zoo (dir. Hans Müller and Wolfgang Staudte)
 1953: Salto Mortale (dir. Victor Tourjansky)
 1954: Der letzte Sommer / The Last Summer (dir. Harald Braun)
 1954: Bildnis einer Unbekannten /  Portrait of an Unknown Woman (dir. Helmut Käutner)
 1955: Der dunkle Stern / The Dark Star (dir. Hermann Kugelstadt)

References

External links 
 

1878 births
1966 deaths
Russian male film actors
Russian male stage actors
Male actors from Saint Petersburg
Russian emigrants to France
Russian emigrants to Germany
People who emigrated to escape Bolshevism